The Abbott Memorial Cup, commonly referred to as the Abbott Cup, was awarded annually from 1919 through 1999 to the Junior "A" ice hockey Champion for Western Canada.

The Cup was named after Captain E.L. (Hick) Abbott who was a noted hockey player in Western Canada.  He captained the Regina Victorias when it won the (pre-Memorial Cup) Junior Championship of Canada in 1913 and 1914. Captain Abbott died in active service in the First World War and the trophy was presented in his memory in 1919 by the Saskatchewan Amateur Hockey Association.

The concept of a Western Canada Junior A Championship was briefly continued from 2013-2017 with the creation of the Western Canada Cup.

History
The Abbott Cup was a playoff round, a best of seven game series, between the British Columbia/Alberta Interprovincial Champions and the Saskatchewan/Manitoba Interprovincial Champions. The Abbott Cup winner would then play off against the Eastern Canadian Champions, the winner of the George Richardson Memorial Trophy, for the Memorial Cup signifying the National Championship.

In 1934 Junior "A" hockey was divided into Junior "A" and "B", with the Abbott Cup staying with the Junior "A" level.  The winner of the Abbott Cup still earned the right to compete for the national Memorial Cup. (Starting in 1983, a Junior "B" Western Canadian Championship was established with the Keystone Cup.)

In 1971 Junior "A" hockey was divided into Major Junior (Tier I) and Junior "A" (Tier II), with the Abbott Cup again staying with the Tier II Junior "A" level. As the Memorial Cup national championship was now reserved for the Major Junior level, the Abbott Cup winner now represented the West in the 'Tier II' Centennial Cup National Championship. (The Major Junior teams in Western Canada now compete for the Western Hockey League's Ed Chynoweth Cup, earning the right to compete for their national Memorial Cup.)

Starting in 1991, because of the realignment of regions and format for the Centennial Cup, the winners of the Doyle Cup and the Anavet Cup would go straight to the National Championship competition rather than hold a separate competition for the western Abbott Cup.  During the Centennial Cup (later Royal Bank Cup) national competition, the winner of the game between the Doyle Cup winner and the Anavet Cup winner would also receive the Abbott Cup.  Since then, the Abbott Cup has diminished in attention, which led to the retirement of the Abbott Cup after it had been awarded to the Vernon Vipers in 1999. It can now be found in the Hockey Hall of Fame.

The Abbott Cup Western Canadian Junior "A" Champion went on to win the National Junior "A" Championship 40 times over 81 years:
Junior "A" Memorial Cup - 19 times in 52 competitions between 1919 and 1970
Tier II Junior "A" Centennial Cup/Royal Bank Cup - 21 times in 29 competitions between 1971 and 1999

The franchise to win the most Abbott Cups was the Regina Patricias/Pats, with 11.  Second were the Edmonton Oil Kings, with 8.  The most consecutive wins by a franchise is 7, for the Edmonton Oil Kings, from 1960 through 1966.  The Prince Albert Raiders follow with 3 consecutive cups, from 1977 through 1979.

The province whose representatives won the most Abbott Cups was Saskatchewan, with 25.  Manitoba representatives won 21 cups, Alberta won 18, British Columbia won 13, and Ontario teams playing in the Manitoba league won 4 cups.  The most consecutive wins by the representatives of the same province is 7, for Alberta, from 1960 through 1966.  British Columbia follows with 5 consecutive cups, from 1989 through 1993.

Champions

1919 to 1934
Presented by the Saskatchewan Amateur Hockey Association to the best Junior "A" team in Western Canada.

(*) Denotes teams that went on to win the national championship Memorial Cup.

1935 to 1970
Starting in 1935, Junior "B" franchises were no longer eligible to compete for the Abbott Cup.

(*) Denotes teams that went on to win the national championship Memorial Cup.

1971 to 1990
Starting in 1971, only Junior "A" (formerly Tier II) clubs competed for the Abbott Cup.

(*) Denotes teams that went on to win the national championship Centennial Cup/Royal Bank Cup.

1991 to 1999
Awarded to the winner of the round robin game between the Doyle and ANAVET champions at the Centennial Cup/Royal Bank Cup

(*) Denotes teams that went on to win the national championship Centennial Cup/Royal Bank Cup.

References 

1919 establishments in Canada
1999 disestablishments in Canada
Canadian Amateur Hockey Association trophies
Canadian Hockey League trophies and awards
Canadian Junior Hockey League trophies and awards
Ice hockey in Western Canada
Ice hockey tournaments in Canada
Memorial Cup